Jack Collins may refer to:

Sports
 Jack Collins (footballer, born 1904) (1904–1968), Australian rules footballer for Melbourne
 Jack Collins (footballer, born 1910) (1910–1972), Australian rules footballer for Geelong
 Jack Collins (footballer, born 1930) (1930–2008), Coleman Medal winning Australian rules footballer for Footscray
 Jack Collins (footballer, born 1925) (1925–1998), Australian rules footballer for Fitzroy and Essendon
 Jack Collins (1930s footballer), English football winger
 Jack Collins (umpire) (born 1932), Australian Test cricket umpire

Other
 Jack Collins (politician) (born 1943), American college basketball coach and Speaker of the New Jersey General Assembly
 Jack Collins (actor) (1918–2005), American stage, film and television actor
 John W. Collins (1912–2001), American chess player and teacher
 C. John Collins, aka Jack Collins, conservative evangelical and fellow of the Discovery

See also
 John Collins (disambiguation)
 Collins (surname)